Lake Neepaulin is a small man-made freshwater lake located in Wantage Township in Sussex County, New Jersey in the United States. Located in the watershed of Papakating Creek, a  tributary of the Wallkill River, the lake was created in the 1950s by damming an unnamed mountain stream as the feature of a private residential development. The stream, now known as Neepaulakating Creek, did not receive a name until 2002.

Description
Lake Neepaulin is a man-made lake created from the damming of Neepaulakating Creek, a small mountain stream that was not named until 2002. These headwaters are located a short distance south of County Route 650 (Libertyville Road) roughly halfway between the hamlet of Libertville in Wantage Township and Sussex Borough. Lake Neepaulin's elevation is  509 feet (155m) above sea level. The lake is the center of a private residential development. From the dam, the creek flows southeast for  before flowing into Papakating Creek, a tributary of the Wallkill River. The creek, lake, and its watershed are located in the Kittatinny Valley which is underlain by dark shale and limestone of the Martinsburg Formation and has soils that are glacial in origin.

According to the New Jersey Department of Environmental Protection (NJDEP), two developed lake communities in the Papakating Creek watershed—Lake Neepaulin and the nearby Clove Acres Lake contribute to phosphorus loading in the waters of Papakating Creek. The phosphorus loading may originate from the runoff of fertilizer applications on residential lawns, nearby agricultural operations, or from large populations of geese that inhabit the lakes.

History
In the 1950s, a real estate developer dammed an unnamed stream located to the west and south of Sussex Borough and created Lake Neepaulin. The lake was the center of a planned private lakeside residential community. The lake's name is an amalgamation of the names of the original developer's children. In 2014, Wantage Township acquired the lake from the former non-profit management organization and has opened designated public areas to township residents for recreation. In acquiring the property, the municipality assumed responsibility for repayment of a $1.2 million dam restoration loan from the NJDEP.

References

External links

 Wallkill River Watershed Management Group

Neepaulin
Papakating Creek watershed
Neepaulin
Tributaries of the Wallkill River